Balaganur  is a village in the southern state of Karnataka, India. It is located in the Sindgi taluk of Bijapur district in Karnataka.

Demographics
According to the 2001 India census, Balaganur had a population of 5780 with 2978 males and 2802 females.

See also
 Bijapur
 Districts of Karnataka
 In balaganur a 'Ramanahalli Tank' situated.This is one of largest tank in south karnataka.
 This village is very popular spiritual village as lot temples situated like

References

External links
 http://Bijapur.nic.in/ 

Villages in Bijapur district, Karnataka